The Flower Shop Mysteries is a series which airs on Hallmark Movies & Mysteries channel.

The films star Brooke Shields and Brennan Elliott and are filmed in the USA and Canada. They are based on the novels by Kate Collins and first aired in 2016.

Series overview
The series centers around a florist and ex-New York City lawyer (Shields) and her involvement in criminal investigations with a local ex-private investigator and local bar owner (Elliott).

Cast and characters
 Abby Knight (Brooke Shields) owns a flower shop and is an ex-lawyer.
 Marco Salvare (Brennan Elliott) used to be a private investigator and now owns a local bar.
 Nikki Bender (Kate Drummond) is Knight's co-worker and best friend.
 Jeffrey Knight (Beau Bridges) is Abby Knight's father.
 Sydney Knight (Celeste Desjardins) is Abby Knight's daughter.

List of films

References

External links
 Official page at Hallmark Movies & Mysteries
 

Entertainment Studios films
2010s English-language films
American mystery drama films
Hallmark Channel original programming
Hallmark Channel original films
American drama television films